Brett Kissel (born May 27, 1990) is a Canadian country singer. He has had four number-one hits on the Canadian country chart with "Airwaves", "Drink About Me", "A Few Good Stories", and "Make a Life, Not a Living". Kissel has released the albums, Started with a Song (2013), Pick Me Up (2015), We Were That Song (2017), Now or Never (2020), What Is Life? (2020), and The Compass Project (2023).

Early life
Kissel was born in St. Paul, Alberta, the son of Brenda and Gordon Kissel. He has one older brother, Jamison. He grew up on a cattle ranch in northeastern Alberta's Flat Lake region, where his family operates the Wengzynowski North View cattle ranch.

Career

2000–2011: Early years
Kissel recorded his first album, Keepin' It Country, when he was 12 years old. 

Kissel released three more albums, By Request in 2004, Tried and True – A Canadian Tribute in 2006 and My Roots Run Deep in 2008.  In 2006, Kissel was nominated for the Chevy Trucks Rising Star Award at the Canadian Country Music Association Awards. Kissel was 16 years old at the time, making him the youngest CCMA nominee in the history of the awards show.

2012–2014: Started with a Song
Kissel met manager Bob Doyle in 2012, who signed Kissel to a co-management contract with Louis O'Reilly.

On May 10, 2013, Kissel signed a record deal with Warner Music Canada. His debut single, "Started with a Song", was released on June 17. It became the most added song at Canadian country radio in its first week, surpassing a Canadian country radio record set by Taylor Swift's "We Are Never Ever Getting Back Together". It debuted at number 87 on the Billboard Canadian Hot 100 for the week of July 27, 2013. The music video for the song premiered on CMT Canada on June 27. Kissel's first album for Warner, also titled Started with a Song, was released on October 1, 2013. 

On February 14, 2014, Kissel released his third single from his Started with a Song album titled "3-2-1". On March 29, 2014, Kissel won his first Juno Award for Breakthrough Artist of the Year, and also performed on the 2014 Juno Awards broadcast on CTV alongside OneRepublic, Tegan and Sara, Bachman–Turner Overdrive and The Sheepdogs.

In September 2014, Kissel led all country singers with eight nominations for the Canadian Country Music Awards held in Edmonton, Alberta.

2015–2018: Pick Me Up and We Were That Song

In September 2017 Kissel won Male Artist of the Year, Interactive Artist of the Year, Country Music Program or Special of the Year and Video of the Year for I Didn't Fall in Love With Your Hair at the 2017 Canadian Country Music Awards. He also released a new album We Were That Song on December 8, 2017. In 2018 he went on a tour across Canada to support the album.

2019–2021: Now or Never, What Is Life?
In September 2019, Kissel released his first American country radio single "Drink About Me", the lead single from his fourth major-label album Now or Never which was released on January 1, 2020. "Drink About Me" would become Kissel's second number one on the Canada Country chart, but wouldn't find a place on the American Country Billboard chart.  "She Drives Me Crazy" was released as the second single off the album in February 2020.

In September 2020, Kissel released this third single off Now or Never, "A Few Good Stories" and picked up 4 CCMA Awards, winning Male Artist of the Year, Fan's Choice, Creative Director, and Album of the Year for Now it Never. Kissel then signed his first American record deal with Verge Records, a Nashville-based partner of ONErpm. "A Few Good Stories" became Kissel's third Number One on Canada Country, "She Drives Me Crazy" became Kissel's second Platinum-certified single, and "Drink About Me" was nominated for Single of the Year at the 2021 Juno Awards.

In March 2021, Kissel released the single "Make a Life, Not a Living", and announced his fifth major-label album What Is Life?, which was released on April 9, 2021. "Make a Life, Not a Living" debuted by setting a record as the most-added song at Canadian country radio in a single week ever. It later became his fourth career Number One at Canadian country radio, and his first song to chart in the top 50 of the Billboard Canadian Hot 100. Kissel won the "Fans' Choice" award at the 2021 Canadian Country Music Awards in November 2021.

2022-present: The Compass Project
In 2022, he released the single "Ain't the Same" with American vocal group 98 Degrees. Along with its follow-up single "Watch It", the song was included on Kissel's studio album The Compass Project - South Album, which was released on January 27, 2023. The entire box set will see Kissel release four different albums as part of The Compass Project in 2023. The South Album also included the single "Never Have I Ever", which was released in January 2023 alongside the official announcement of the project. The "East", "West", and "North" albums will arrive later in 2023.

Personal life
Brett Kissel married Cecilia Friesen in July 2011 in Edmonton, Alberta. They lived in Nashville, Tennessee for several years.  In 2016, Cecilia gave birth to their daughter. Kissel and his family now reside on his family farm in northern Alberta.

Discography

Studio albums

Singles

As lead artist

As featured artist

Christmas singles

Promotional singles

Music videos

Awards and nominations

Notes

References

External links

1990 births
Canadian country singer-songwriters
Canadian male singer-songwriters
Living people
Musicians from Alberta
Canadian people of Ukrainian descent
Warner Music Group artists
Juno Award for Breakthrough Artist of the Year winners
People from the Municipal District of Bonnyville No. 87
21st-century Canadian male singers
Juno Award for Country Album of the Year winners
Canadian Country Music Association Male Artist of the Year winners
Canadian Country Music Association Fans' Choice Award winners
Canadian Country Music Association Album of the Year winners